Overmyer is a surname. Notable people with the surname include:

 Amanda Overmyer (born c. 1984), American rock singer-songwriter
 Arthur W. Overmyer (1879–1952), American politician and judge
 Bill Overmyer (born 1949), American football player
 David Hicks Overmyer (1889–1973), American muralist
 Daniel H. Overmyer (1924–2012), American businessman
 Daniel L. Overmyer (born 1935), Canadian historian of Chinese religion
 Eric Overmyer (born 1951), American writer and producer
 Robert F. Overmyer (1936–1996), test pilot, naval aviator, aeronautical engineer, physicist, United States Marine Corps officer and astronaut

See also
 Overmyer Network, an American television network from 1966 to 1967